Thomas Champion may refer to:
 Thomas Champion (priest)
 Thomas Champion (cyclist)